Zulu Dawn is a 1979 American adventure war film about the historical Battle of Isandlwana between British and Zulu forces in 1879 in South Africa. The screenplay was by Cy Endfield, from his book, and Anthony Storey.  The film was directed by Douglas Hickox. The score was composed by Elmer Bernstein.

Zulu Dawn is a prequel to Zulu, released in 1964, which depicts the historical Battle of Rorke's Drift later the same day, and which was co-written and directed by Cy Endfield.

Plot

The film opens in the Cape Colony in January 1879. British Army officer Lord Chelmsford plots with diplomat Sir Henry Bartle Frere to annex the neighbouring Zulu Empire, which they perceive as a threat to the Cape Colony's emerging industrial economy. Frere issues an ultimatum to the Zulu king, Cetshwayo, demanding that he dissolve the Zulu military; an indignant Cetshwayo rebuffs the demand, providing Lord Chelmsford and Frere with a casus belli against the Zulus. Despite objections from prominent individuals in the Cape Colony and Great Britain, Frere authorises Lord Chelmsford to command a British expeditionary force to invade the Zulu Empire.

The British expeditionary force marches into the Zulu Empire, with Lord Chelmsford directing it towards the Zulu capital, Ulundi. Eager to bring the war to a swift conclusion, the British become increasingly frustrated as the Zulu military adopted a Fabian strategy, refusing to engage in a pitched battle; a few skirmishes occurred between British and Zulu scouts with indecisive results. Three Zulu warriors allowed themselves to be captured in a skirmish and are interrogated by the British, but refused to divulge any information and eventually escape, informing their commander of the British dispositions. Halfway to Ulundi, Lord Chelmsford, ordered the British force to make camp at the base of Mount Isandlwana, ignoring the advice of his Boer attendants to fortify the camp and transform his supply wagons into a laager.

Upon receiving inaccurate reports from his scouts concerning the Zulus' dispositions, Lord Chelmsford leads half the British force on a wild goose chase far from the camp against a phantom Zulu force. The next day, the British camp receives reinforcements led by Colonel Durnford, who dispatches scouts to reconnoiter the surrounding area before leaving the camp to personally scout the region. One of the British scouting parties discovers a Zulu force massing at the bottom of a nearby valley. The Zulu force quickly attacks the British camp, but are initially repulsed; however, they spread out and adopt a strategy of encircling the British, who are eventually pushed back after they run out of ammunition. A massed infantry charge by the Zulu force breaks the British lines, causing them to retreat back towards their camp. Overwhelmed by the attacking Zulus, the British force collapses and is quickly massacred.

Zulu warriors quickly hunt down any British survivors fleeing the battle, while several British soldiers attempt an unsuccessful last stand. The British camp's commander, Colonel Pulleine, entrusts a regimental colour to his soldiers who attempt to carry it safely back to the Cape Colony; they pass numerous dead and dying British soldiers during their journey. Eventually reaching the Buffalo River, the British soldiers are discovered and killed by Zulu warriors; the colour is captured by a Zulu. One of the British soldiers, who lies mortally wounded, shoots and kills the Zulu wielding the colour, who drops it into the river, where it floats out of reach of the Zulu force. In the evening, Lord Chelmsford returns to the scene of the battle, and receives news that a Zulu force has attacked Rorke's Drift. The film ends with Zulu warriors dragging captured artillery back to Ulundi.

Cast
 Peter O'Toole as Lieutenant General Lord Chelmsford
 Burt Lancaster as Colonel Anthony Durnford
 Denholm Elliott as Colonel Henry Pulleine
 James Faulkner as Lieutenant Teignmouth Melvill
 Christopher Cazenove as Lieutenant Coghill
 Simon Ward as Lieutenant William Vereker
 Bob Hoskins as Colour Sergeant Williams
 Peter Vaughan as Quartermaster Bloomfield
 Michael Jayston as Colonel Henry Hope Crealock
 Ronald Pickup as Lieutenant Harford
 Ronald Lacey as Norris "Noggs" Newman
 John Mills as Sir Henry Bartle Frere
 Simon Sabela as King Cetshwayo
 Ken Gampu as Mantshonga
 Abe Temba as Uhama
 Gilbert Tiabane as Bayele
 Dai Bradley as Private Williams
 Paul Copley as Corporal Storey
 Donald Pickering as Major Russell R.A.
 Nicholas Clay as Lieutenant Raw
 Phil Daniels as Boy Pullen
 Ian Yule as Corporal Fields
 Peter J. Elliott as Sentry
 Brian O'Shaughnessy as Major Smith R.A.

Production
The script was originally written by Cy Endfield.

The Lamitas Property Investment Corporation raised money for the film. They financed a series of films, including several in South Africa, such as The Wild Geese (1978). The company committed about £5 million to Zulu Dawn, most of it raised from a Swiss bank, the Banque de Paris et des Pay Bas. HBO helped guarantee finance. The budget was initially set at $6.5 million but the budget kept increasing and eventually cost $11.75 million, despite coming in only two days over schedule.

Jake Eberts was involved in raising finance for the film. He had to guarantee Burt Lancaster's salary when Lancaster's agent insisted on one. This meant Eberts was liable for the loan. In 1983 the interest made this £450,000. Eberts spent years paying it back.

John Hurt was cast in a lead role but was refused entry to South Africa. This confused Hurt who was not particularly political. It was thought South African Intelligence may have confused him with the actor John Hurd, who was a draft dodger.

Orion Pictures picked the film up for worldwide distribution through Warner Bros. and other companies.

Shooting
Every day over 1,000 people were involved in filming, with Zulu extras being paid £2.70 per day.

In 1978, the producers and financiers agreed to defer their fees and no completion guarantee was in place to get the film finished. Norma Foster was a liaison between the South African government (notably the Minister of Information, Dr Connie Mulder) and the filmmakers; she later claimed the producers owed her £20,000. Co-producers, James Faulkner and Barrie Saint Clair, claimed they were owed £100,000 in deferred fees. Over 100 creditors in South Africa claimed they were owed £250,000. Faulkner and Saint Clair sought an injunction to block screening of the film until they were paid. Lamitas denied liability for the money, claiming expenses exceeded the agreed budget and the injunction was lifted May 21, 1979. They later offered to settle for 25 pence on the pound.

Reception
The film has received mixed reviews. On review aggregation website Rotten Tomatoes, Zulu Dawn has an approval rating of 50% based on 8 reviews and an average rating of 6.03/10.

References

External links
 
 
 
 http://www.takeoneinplease.com for commentary in British film section on how Victorians managed to change perceptions of battles of Rorke's Drift and Isandhlwana.

1979 films
Prequel films
1970s war films
1970s historical films
American historical films
1970s English-language films
War films based on actual events
Films directed by Douglas Hickox
Films scored by Elmer Bernstein
Films set in South Africa
Films set in the British Empire
Films shot in South Africa
Films set in 1879
Works about the Anglo-Zulu War
1970s American films
American prequel films